Madatharuvi is a stream that joins the Pampa River in Ranni. It consist of a series of waterfalls and rapids that pass through pristine tropical forests.
untouched by industries the water is pure and fresh with a few species of fresh water fish.
It is near to Ranny city which the place is Mandamaruthi.  From Mandamaruthi it is near 5 km.  It is a small water stream with fresh water which is originating from forest, at last it will reach and join in Pamba River. 
 

Rivers of Pathanamthitta district
Pamba River